William Ive may refer to:

William Ive (Mayor of Sandwich, 1348–1349)
William Ive (Sandwich MP), MP for Sandwich in 1386, son of the above
William Ive, Coventry preacher and commentator on Loveday, 1458
William Ive (vice-chancellor), Vice-Chancellor of the University of Oxford in 1461 and 1462
William Ive, Vice-Admiral of Essex for 1577
William Ive (Leicester MP) (1597–1641), English MP in 1624

See also
William Ives (disambiguation)